Sanford Panitch is an American film industry executive.  Appointed president of Sony Pictures Motion Picture Group in October 2019, he served previously as president of Columbia Pictures. Earlier in his career, he founded Fox International Productions,  a division of 21st Century Fox.

Early life and education 
Panitch was born in Los Angeles, to Hersh Panitch, an entertainment business manager, and Elaine Panitch, a teacher and author. He attended Tulane University in New Orleans.  During school breaks Panitch interned for New Line Cinema, and as a student he founded Revive Screening to distribute New Line Films at various venues in New Orleans.  After graduating from Tulane with a degree in Political Science, Panitch sold the company and returned to Los Angeles.

Career 
In 1995, Panitch was named executive vice president of Production at 20th Century Studios.  In 2008, recognizing the growth of international box office and seeing the large percentage of market share for locally produced films, Panitch founded Fox International Productions. 
 He served as its president until April 2015, when he joined Sony Pictures as president of international film and television. In June 2016, he was named President of Columbia Pictures.  He was promoted to president of Sony Motion Picture Group in October 2019.

References 

Year of birth missing (living people)
Living people
Tulane University alumni
People from Los Angeles
Sony Pictures Entertainment people
Presidents of Columbia Pictures